Secret Seven may refer to:

The Secret Seven, a child detective series by Enid Blyton
 The Secret Seven (film), a 1940 American crime film
The Secret Seven (Frank Richards), a series of stories by Frank Richards
Secret Seven (TV series), a 2017 Thai TV series